Zasavica is a small village in the municipality of Šamac. The Bosna River flows near the village.

Census

Sources
 Book: "Ethnic Composition of the population - Search for the Republic by municipalities and populated areas 1991th (sic!)", statistical bulletin no. 234, Release of the Central Bureau of Statistics of Bosnia and Herzegovina, Sarajevo.
 Internet - source "list for local communities" - https://web.archive.org/web/20131005002409/http://www.fzs.ba/Podaci/nacion%20po%20mjesnim.pdf

External links
 Google Maps

Populated places in Šamac, Bosnia and Herzegovina
Villages in Republika Srpska